Marcus Franklee Foster (born June 3, 1995) is an American professional basketball player for Rytas Vilnius of the Lithuanian Basketball League (LKL) and the Basketball Champions League. He played college basketball for Kansas State University and Creighton University before playing professionally in South Korea, Lebanon, Israel, Turkey, Greece, and Lithuania.

Early life and high school career
Foster is the son of Melvin and Alvita Foster. Foster has two older sisters. Growing up in Wichita Falls, Texas, Marcus Foster began playing basketball at a young age and developed a reputation as a gymrat. He competed for Hirschi High School and was a well-regarded recruit for Kansas State.

College career

Kansas State
Foster was a surprise star at Kansas State, scoring 25 points in his second game in uniform. In a game against Texas in February, he contributed 34 points. Foster had 29 in a matchup versus Baylor in March. He was named Second Team All-Big 12 and led Kansas State to a nine seed in the NCAA Tournament. On the season, Foster averaged 15.5 points, 3.2 rebounds and 2.5 assists per game, and he shot 40 percent from behind the 3-point arc. He went to the LeBron James Skill Academy in the summer.

In his sophomore year, Foster was named to the Preseason First Team All-Big 12. However, Foster had a very disappointing season, which he blamed on focusing too much on the NBA. He gained weight and was suspended three games into the conference season. Foster's per game averages dropped to 12.5 points, 2.3 rebounds and 1.9 assists per game. Kansas State limped to a 15–17 record, and at the end of the season coach Bruce Weber dismissed him. Foster transferred to Creighton since he had developed a relationship with coach Greg McDermott.

Creighton
Per NCAA policy, Foster was forced to sit out a season. Coming into his redshirt junior season, Foster was named Preseason Big East Honorable Mention. He was the first player in 30 years to score 15 or more points in the first eight games of Creighton's season. On February 19, 2017, Foster scored a career-high 35 points in an 87–70 win against Georgetown. At the conclusion of the season, he garnered First Team All-Big East honors. He was named one of five finalists for the Jerry West Award. Foster scored 638 points as a junior, the highest for a Creighton newcomer, for an 18.2 points per game average, third highest in the Big East. After deliberating for a few days, he opted to return for his senior year.

On September 29, 2017, Foster's girlfriend Chelsea Ghasemi gave birth to their first child. Foster was named to the Preseason First Team All-Big East as a senior. He had a season-high 32 points in a 90–81 win versus UT Arlington on December 19. On February 7, 2018, Foster scored his 2,000th career point on a game-winning shot to defeat DePaul. In his final college game, a loss to Kansas State in the first round of the NCAA Tournament, he scored just five points but embraced Bruce Weber after the game. Foster averaged 19.8 points, 3.9 rebounds and 2.7 assists per game as a senior. Foster was named to the First Team All-Big East. After the season he was invited to the 2018 Portsmouth Invitational Tournament.

Professional career

2018–19 season
After going undrafted in the 2018 NBA draft, he joined the Sacramento Kings for the 2018 NBA Summer League. 

On August 2, 2018, Foster signed his professional contract with Wonju DB Promy of the Korean Basketball League (KBL). On October 17, 2018, Foster recorded a career-high 47 points, shooting 16-of-27 from the field, along with nine rebounds, six assists and three steals in a 117–116 win over the Changwon LG Sakers. In 51 games played for Wonju, he finished the season as the league fourth-leading scorer with 25.2 points, along with 5.2 rebounds and 3.7 assists per game.

On March 28, 2019, Foster signed with Champville SC of the Lebanese Basketball League for the rest of the season.

2019–20 season
In June 2019, Foster joined the Orlando Magic for the 2019 NBA Summer League.

On July 31, 2019, Foster signed with Hapoel Holon of the Israeli Premier League and the Basketball Champions League (BCL) for the 2019–20 season. On October 11, 2019, Foster recorded 20 points in his debut, while shooting 7-of-12 from the field, along with six rebounds and four assists in a 103–86 win over Maccabi Ashdod. On November 9, 2019, Foster recorded a season-high 29 points, while shooting 6-of-9 from three-point range, leading Holon to a 92–73 win over Hapoel Be'er Sheva. In 34 games played for Hapoel (both in the Israeli League and the BCL), Foster averaged 19.2 points, 3.2 rebounds and 3.6 assists per game.

2020–21 season
On July 14, 2020, Foster signed a one-year deal with Panathinaikos of the Greek Basket League and the EuroLeague, with the option for an additional season. On February 18, 2021, he was released from the Greek club.

On February 18, 2021, Foster signed with Türk Telekom of the Turkish Basketball Super League.

2021–22 season
In October 2021, Foster signed with the Houston Rockets of the National Basketball Association (NBA) for training camp. He subsequently joined the Rio Grande Valley Vipers as an affiliate player. On May 19, 2022, Foster returned to Greece, signing with Promitheas Patras before the start of the Greek Basket League playoffs. In 10 games played, he averaged 12.5 points, 2.7 rebounds and 2 assists, playing around 24 minutes per contest.

2022–2023 season
On August 2, 2022, Foster signed with Rytas Vilnius of the Lithuanian Basketball League (LKL) and the Basketball Champions League.

References

External links
Creighton Bluejays bio
Kansas State Wildcats bio
Eurobasket profile
Proballers.com profile
RealGM profile

1995 births
Living people
American expatriate basketball people in Greece
American expatriate basketball people in Israel
American expatriate basketball people in Lebanon
American expatriate basketball people in Lithuania
American expatriate basketball people in South Korea
American expatriate basketball people in Turkey
American men's basketball players
Basketball players from Texas
BC Rytas players
Creighton Bluejays men's basketball players
Hapoel Holon players
Kansas State Wildcats men's basketball players
Parade High School All-Americans (boys' basketball)
Panathinaikos B.C. players
Promitheas Patras B.C. players
People from Wichita Falls, Texas
Rio Grande Valley Vipers players
Shooting guards
Türk Telekom B.K. players
Wonju DB Promy players